Takan (also Romanized as Takān) is a village in Charuymaq-e Sharqi Rural District, Shadian District, Charuymaq County, East Azerbaijan Province, Iran. At the 2006 census, its population was 36, in 7 families.

References 

Populated places in Charuymaq County